Emergence is a solo album by Czech bassist Miroslav Vitouš recorded in 1985 and released on the ECM label.

Reception 
The Allmusic review by David R. Adler awarded the album 3 stars stating "Emergence showcases Miroslav Vitouš in a solo bass setting, with no overdubs. It's austere and challenging, but Vitous is never ponderous; he sustains plenty of interest with his passion and staggering technique, dividing his time equally between pizzicato and arco statements... An excellent complement to other solo bass statements on ECM, most notably by Dave Holland and Gary Peacock".

In 2011, Ricardo Villalobos and Max Loderbauer used samples of Emergence as the basis for the track "Reemergence" on the remix album Re:ECM.

Track listing 
All compositions by Miroslav Vitouš except as indicated
 "Epilogue" - 8:13 
 "Transformation" - 5:58 
 "Atlantis Suite: Emergence of the Spirit" - 4:53 
 "Atlantis Suite: Matter and Spirit" - 1:56 
 "Atlantis Suite: The Choice" - 1:58 
 "Atlantis Suite: Destruction Into Energy" - 3:05 
 "Wheel of Fortune (When Face Gets Pale)" - 6:08 
 "Regards to Gershwin's Honeyman" - 3:28 
 "Alice in Wonderland" (Sammy Fain, Bob Hilliard) - 3:43 
 "Morning Lake for Ever" - 5:34 
 "Variations on Spanish Themes" - 8:38 
Recorded at Tonstudio Bauer in Ludwigsburg, West Germany in September 1985

Personnel 
 Miroslav Vitouš — double bass

References 

ECM Records albums
Miroslav Vitouš albums
1986 albums
Albums produced by Manfred Eicher